CLL is an abbreviation that can stand for:
Chronic lymphocytic leukemia
Central Lancashire League 
Community language learning
Easterwood Airport, Texas, USA, IATA code
Collington railway station, a railway station in Sussex, England